Sandra Braganza (born 30 November 1961) is an Indian former cricketer who played as a right-arm medium bowler. She appeared in six Test matches and nine One Day Internationals for India between 1984 and 1993, as well as appearing in 11 One Day Internationals for International XI at the 1982 World Cup. She played domestic cricket for  Andhra and Railways.

References

External links
 

1961 births
Living people
Cricketers from Jalandhar
Indian women cricketers
India women Test cricketers
India women One Day International cricketers
International XI women One Day International cricketers
Andhra women cricketers
Railways women cricketers